I Do, I Do,  is a 2005 Singaporean romantic comedy film directed by Jack Neo and Lim Boon Hwee. It was the first time Neo had directed a romance film.

Plot
Workaholic Liu Wenhui dreams of meeting the perfect partner. Truck driver Lee Ah Peng is in love with her, but she rejects him. She soon falls in love with hunky new colleague Chen Jianfeng.

Cast
 Sharon Au as Liu Wenhui
 Adrian Pang as Lee Ah Peng
 Allan Wu as Chen Jianfeng
 Marcus Chin as Xu Wenbing
 John Cheng as Jo Jo Chin
 Mark Lee as Loan Shark
 Jack Neo as Member of Parliament
 Patricia Mok
 Henry Thia

Release
The film released in theatres on 8 February 2005.

Reception
Chen Yunhong of Shin Min Daily News rated the film three-and-a-half stars out of five. Wendy Teo gave the film two-and-a-half stars out of five, praising the performances of Pang and Chin, as well as the cameo of Lee, but criticising the film's editing, the "cliched" twist, and stated that "the thin material of I Do I Do doesn't provide a wide enough stage for their talents."

References

External links
 

2005 films
Singaporean romantic comedy films
Films directed by Jack Neo